Martina Navratilova and Pam Shriver were the defending champions but did not compete that year.

Steffi Graf and Gabriela Sabatini won in the final 7–6(8–6), 6–3 against Gigi Fernández and Zina Garrison.

Seeds
Champion seeds are indicated in bold text while text in italics indicates the round in which those seeds were eliminated.

Draw

Finals

Top half

Section 1

Section 2

Bottom half

Section 3

Section 4

References
 1988 Lipton International Players Championships Women's Doubles Draw

1988 Lipton International Players Championships
Lipton Championships - Women's Doubles